Macina may refer to:

Macina Empire (1818–1862), former state located in present-day Mali
Inner Niger Delta, also known as Macina, the floodplain area in Mali once controlled by the empire
Macina, town and rural commune in Mali
Macina (musical instrument), a high-pitched string instrument used in Indonesian kroncong music

See also
Masina (disambiguation)
Messina (disambiguation)
Macinaggio, a French village in Corsica